The Saab 9-X Biohybrid concept car was developed by Saab in 2008, and first shown at the Geneva Motor Show. It is based on the GM Delta platform, and was thought to give an idea of the cancelled Saab 9-1X.

It has keyless entry and small cameras instead of rear-view mirrors. On the roof, there is a solar panel, like in the Saab EV-1, for charging the battery, both when driving and when parked. The headlights are automatic. A front mounted camera detects if you meet another car.

Connected to the engine by a belt is GM's BAS+ hybrid system which can provide a boost up to 19 hp. 

It has four seats although the headroom in the rear is somewhat restricted. As the name suggests, it runs both regular gasoline and E85. 

When braking at speeds above , the spoiler acts like an air brake and also is used to increase the downforce of the car.

References

External links 

 https://web.archive.org/web/20080622211542/http://www.saab.com/main/GLOBAL/en/9X_biohybrid/index.shtml

9-X Biohybrid
Electric concept cars
Flexible-fuel vehicles